In astronomy, the interstellar medium (ISM) is the matter and radiation that exist in the space between the star systems in a galaxy. This matter includes gas in ionic, atomic, and molecular form, as well as dust and cosmic rays. It fills interstellar space and blends smoothly into the surrounding intergalactic space. The energy that occupies the same volume, in the form of electromagnetic radiation, is the interstellar radiation field.

The interstellar medium is composed of multiple phases distinguished by whether matter is ionic, atomic, or molecular, and the temperature and density of the matter. The interstellar medium is composed, primarily, of hydrogen, followed by helium with trace amounts of carbon, oxygen, and nitrogen. The thermal pressures of these phases are in rough equilibrium with one another. Magnetic fields and turbulent motions also provide pressure in the ISM, and are typically more important, dynamically, than the thermal pressure is.
In the interstellar medium, matter is primarily in molecular form, and reaches number densities of 106 molecules per cm3 (1 million molecules per cm3). In hot, diffuse regions of the ISM, matter is primarily ionized, and the density may be as low as 10−4 ions per cm3. Compare this with a number density of roughly 1019 molecules per cm3 for air at sea level, and 1010 molecules per cm3 (10 billion molecules per cm3) for a laboratory high-vacuum chamber. By mass, 99% of the ISM is gas in any form, and 1% is dust. Of the gas in the ISM, by number 91% of atoms are hydrogen and 8.9% are helium, with 0.1% being atoms of elements heavier than hydrogen or helium, known as "metals" in astronomical parlance. By mass this amounts to 70% hydrogen, 28% helium, and 1.5% heavier elements. The hydrogen and helium are primarily a result of primordial nucleosynthesis, while the heavier elements in the ISM are mostly a result of enrichment (due to stellar gravity and radiation pressure) in the process of stellar evolution.

The ISM plays a crucial role in astrophysics precisely because of its intermediate role between stellar and galactic scales. Stars form within the densest regions of the ISM, which ultimately contributes to molecular clouds and replenishes the ISM with matter and energy through planetary nebulae, stellar winds, and supernovae. This interplay between stars and the ISM helps determine the rate at which a galaxy depletes its gaseous content, and therefore its lifespan of active star formation.

Voyager 1 reached the ISM on August 25, 2012, making it the first artificial object from Earth to do so. Interstellar plasma and dust will be studied until the estimated mission end date of 2025. Its twin Voyager 2 entered the ISM on November 5, 2018.

Interstellar matter

Table 1 shows a breakdown of the properties of the components of the ISM of the Milky Way.

The three-phase model

 put forward the static two phase equilibrium model to explain the observed properties of the ISM. Their modeled ISM included of a cold dense phase (T < 300 K), consisting of clouds of neutral and molecular hydrogen, and a warm intercloud phase (T ~ 104 K), consisting of rarefied neutral and ionized gas.  added a dynamic third phase that represented the very hot (T ~ 106 K) gas that had been shock heated by supernovae and constituted most of the volume of the ISM.
These phases are the temperatures where heating and cooling can reach a stable equilibrium. Their paper formed the basis for further study over the subsequent three decades. However, the relative proportions of the phases and their subdivisions are still not well understood.

The atomic hydrogen model
This model takes into account only atomic hydrogen: A temperature higher than 3000 K breaks molecules, while that lower than 50000 K leaves atoms in their ground state. It is assumed that the influence of other atoms (He ...) is negligible. The pressure is assumed to be very low, so the durations of the free paths of atoms are longer than the ~ 1 nanosecond duration of the light pulses that constitute ordinary, temporally incoherent light.

In this collisionless gas, Einstein's theory of coherent light-matter interactions applies: all the gas-light interactions are spatially coherent.
Suppose that a monochromatic light is pulsed, then scattered by molecules with a quadrupole (Raman) resonance frequency. If the “length of light pulses is shorter than all involved time constants” (Lamb (1971)), an “impulsive stimulated Raman scattering (ISRS)” (Yan, Gamble & Nelson (1985)) applies: the light generated by incoherent Raman scattering at a shifted frequency has a phase independent of the phase of the exciting light, thus generating a new spectral line, and coherence between the incident and scattered light facilitates their interference into a single frequency, thus shifting the incident frequency.
Assume that a star radiates a continuous light spectrum up to X-rays. Lyman frequencies are absorbed in this light and pump atoms mainly to the first excited state. In this state, the hyperfine periods are longer than 1 ns, so an ISRS “may” redshift the light frequency, populating high hyperfine levels. Another ISRS “may” transfer energy from hyperfine levels to thermal electromagnetic waves, so the redshift is permanent. The temperature of a light beam is defined by its frequency and spectral radiance with Planck's formula. As entropy must increase, “may” becomes “does”.
However, where a previously absorbed line (first Lyman beta, ...) reaches the Lyman alpha frequency, the redshifting process stops, and all hydrogen lines are strongly absorbed. But this stop is not perfect if there is energy at the frequency shifted to Lyman beta frequency, which produces a slow redshift. Successive redshifts separated by Lyman absorptions generate many absorption lines, frequencies of which, deduced from absorption process, obey a law more dependable than Karlsson's formula.

The previous process excites more and more atoms because a de-excitation obeys Einstein's law of coherent interactions: Variation dI of radiance I of a light beam along a path dx is dI=BIdx, where B is Einstein amplification coefficient which depends on medium. I is the modulus of Poynting vector of field, absorption occurs for an opposed vector, which corresponds to a change of sign of B. Factor I in this formula shows that intense rays are more amplified than weak ones (competition of modes). Emission of a flare requires a sufficient radiance I provided by random zero point field. After emission of a flare, weak B increases by pumping while I remains close to zero: De-excitation by a coherent emission involves stochastic parameters of zero point field, as observed close to quasars (and in polar auroras).

Structures

The ISM is turbulent and therefore full of structure on all spatial scales. Stars are born deep inside large complexes of molecular clouds, typically a few parsecs in size. During their lives and deaths, stars interact physically with the ISM.

Stellar winds from young clusters of stars (often with giant or supergiant HII regions surrounding them) and shock waves created by supernovae inject enormous amounts of energy into their surroundings, which leads to hypersonic turbulence. The resultant structures – of varying sizes – can be observed, such as stellar wind bubbles and superbubbles of hot gas, seen by X-ray satellite telescopes or turbulent flows observed in radio telescope maps.

The Sun is currently traveling through the Local Interstellar Cloud, a denser region in the low-density Local Bubble.

In October 2020, astronomers reported a significant unexpected increase in density in the space beyond the Solar System as detected by the Voyager 1 and Voyager 2 space probes. According to the researchers, this implies that "the density gradient is a large-scale feature of the VLISM (very local interstellar medium) in the general direction of the heliospheric nose".

Interaction with interplanetary medium

The interstellar medium begins where the interplanetary medium of the Solar System ends. The solar wind slows to subsonic velocities at the termination shock, 90–100 astronomical units from the Sun. In the region beyond the termination shock, called the heliosheath, interstellar matter interacts with the solar wind. Voyager 1, the farthest human-made object from the Earth (after 1998), crossed the termination shock December 16, 2004 and later entered interstellar space when it crossed the heliopause on August 25, 2012, providing the first direct probe of conditions in the ISM .

Interstellar extinction

The ISM is also responsible for extinction and reddening, the decreasing light intensity and shift in the dominant observable wavelengths of light from a star. These effects are caused by scattering and absorption of photons and allow the ISM to be observed with the naked eye in a dark sky. The apparent rifts that can be seen in the band of the Milky Way – a uniform disk of stars – are caused by absorption of background starlight by molecular clouds within a few thousand light years from Earth.

Far ultraviolet light is absorbed effectively by the neutral components of the ISM. For example, a typical absorption wavelength of atomic hydrogen lies at about 121.5 nanometers, the Lyman-alpha transition. Therefore, it is nearly impossible to see light emitted at that wavelength from a star farther than a few hundred light years from Earth, because most of it is absorbed during the trip to Earth by intervening neutral hydrogen.

Heating and cooling 

The ISM is usually far from thermodynamic equilibrium. Collisions establish a Maxwell–Boltzmann distribution of velocities, and the 'temperature' normally used to describe interstellar gas is the 'kinetic temperature', which describes the temperature at which the particles would have the observed Maxwell–Boltzmann velocity distribution in thermodynamic equilibrium. However, the interstellar radiation field is typically much weaker than a medium in thermodynamic equilibrium; it is most often roughly that of an A star (surface temperature of ~10,000 K) highly diluted. Therefore, bound levels within an atom or molecule in the ISM are rarely populated according to the Boltzmann formula .

Depending on the temperature, density, and ionization state of a portion of the ISM, different heating and cooling mechanisms determine the temperature of the gas.

Heating mechanisms 

 Heating by low-energy cosmic rays The first mechanism proposed for heating the ISM was heating by low-energy cosmic rays. Cosmic rays are an efficient heating source able to penetrate in the depths of molecular clouds. Cosmic rays transfer energy to gas through both ionization and excitation and to free electrons through Coulomb interactions. Low-energy cosmic rays (a few MeV) are more important because they are far more numerous than high-energy cosmic rays.

 Photoelectric heating by grains The ultraviolet radiation emitted by hot stars can remove electrons from dust grains. The photon is absorbed by the dust grain, and some of its energy is used to overcome the potential energy barrier and remove the electron from the grain. This potential barrier is due to the binding energy of the electron (the work function) and the charge of the grain. The remainder of the photon's energy gives the ejected electron kinetic energy which heats the gas through collisions with other particles. A typical size distribution of dust grains is n(r) ∝ r, where r is the radius of the dust particle. Assuming this, the projected grain surface area distribution is πrn(r) ∝ r. This indicates that the smallest dust grains dominate this method of heating.
 Photoionization When an electron is freed from an atom (typically from absorption of a UV photon) it carries kinetic energy away of the order E − E. This heating mechanism dominates in H II regions, but is negligible in the diffuse ISM due to the relative lack of neutral carbon atoms.
 X-ray heating X-rays remove electrons from atoms and ions, and those photoelectrons can provoke secondary ionizations. As the intensity is often low, this heating is only efficient in warm, less dense atomic medium (as the column density is small). For example, in molecular clouds only hard x-rays can penetrate and x-ray heating can be ignored. This is assuming the region is not near an x-ray source such as a supernova remnant.
 Chemical heating Molecular hydrogen (H2) can be formed on the surface of dust grains when two H atoms (which can travel over the grain) meet. This process yields 4.48 eV of energy distributed over the rotational and vibrational modes, kinetic energy of the H2 molecule, as well as heating the dust grain. This kinetic energy, as well as the energy transferred from de-excitation of the hydrogen molecule through collisions, heats the gas.
 Grain-gas heating Collisions at high densities between gas atoms and molecules with dust grains can transfer thermal energy. This is not important in HII regions because UV radiation is more important. It is also less important in diffuse ionized medium due to the low density. In the neutral diffuse medium grains are always colder, but do not effectively cool the gas due to the low densities.

Grain heating by thermal exchange is very important in supernova remnants where densities and temperatures are very high.

Gas heating via grain-gas collisions is dominant deep in giant molecular clouds (especially at high densities). Far infrared radiation penetrates deeply due to the low optical depth. Dust grains are heated via this radiation and can transfer thermal energy during collisions with the gas. A measure of efficiency in the heating is given by the accommodation coefficient:

where T is the gas temperature, Td the dust temperature, and T2 the post-collision temperature of the gas atom or molecule.

 Other heating mechanisms A variety of macroscopic heating mechanisms are present including:
 Gravitational collapse of a cloud
 Supernova explosions
 Stellar winds
 Expansion of H II regions
 Magnetohydrodynamic waves created by supernova remnants

Cooling mechanisms 

 Fine structure cooling The process of fine structure cooling is dominant in most regions of the Interstellar Medium, except regions of hot gas and regions deep in molecular clouds. It occurs most efficiently with abundant atoms having fine structure levels close to the fundamental level such as: C II and O I in the neutral medium and O II, O III, N II, N III, Ne II and Ne III in H II regions. Collisions will excite these atoms to higher levels, and they will eventually de-excite through photon emission, which will carry the energy out of the region.

 Cooling by permitted lines At lower temperatures, more levels than fine structure levels can be populated via collisions. For example, collisional excitation of the n = 2 level of hydrogen will release a Ly-α photon upon de-excitation. In molecular clouds, excitation of rotational lines of CO is important. Once a molecule is excited, it eventually returns to a lower energy state, emitting a photon which can leave the region, cooling the cloud.

Radiowave propagation 

Radio waves from ≈10 kHz (very low frequency) to ≈300 GHz (extremely high frequency) propagate differently in interstellar space than on the Earth's surface. There are many sources of interference and signal distortion that do not exist on Earth. A great deal of radio astronomy depends on compensating for the different propagation effects to uncover the desired signal.

Discoveries

In 1864, William Huggins used spectroscopy to determine that a nebula is made of gas. Huggins had a private observatory with an 8-inch telescope, with a lens by Alvin Clark; but it was equipped for spectroscopy which enabled breakthrough observations.

In 1904, one of the discoveries made using the Potsdam Great Refractor telescope was of calcium in the interstellar medium. The astronomer Johannes Frank Hartmann determined from spectrograph observations of the binary star Mintaka in Orion, that there was the element calcium in the intervening space.

Interstellar gas was further confirmed by Slipher in 1909, and then by 1912 interstellar dust was confirmed by Slipher. In this way the overall nature of the interstellar medium was confirmed in a series of discoveries and postulizations of its nature.

In September 2020, evidence was presented of solid-state water in the interstellar medium, and particularly, of water ice mixed with silicate grains in cosmic dust grains.

History of knowledge of interstellar space

The nature of the interstellar medium has received the attention of astronomers and scientists over the centuries and understanding of the ISM has developed. However, they first had to acknowledge the basic concept of "interstellar" space. The term appears to have been first used in print by : "The Interstellar Skie.. hath .. so much Affinity with the Starre, that there is a Rotation of that, as well as of the Starre." Later, natural philosopher  discussed "The inter-stellar part of heaven, which several of the modern Epicureans would have to be empty."

Before modern electromagnetic theory, early physicists postulated that an invisible luminiferous aether existed as a medium to carry lightwaves. It was assumed that this aether extended into interstellar space, as  wrote, "this efflux occasions a thrill, or vibratory motion, in the ether which fills the interstellar spaces."

The advent of deep photographic imaging allowed Edward Barnard to produce the first images of dark nebulae silhouetted against the background star field of the galaxy, while the first actual detection of cold diffuse matter in interstellar space was made by Johannes Hartmann in 1904 through the use of absorption line spectroscopy. In his historic study of the spectrum and orbit of Delta Orionis, Hartmann observed the light coming from this star and realized that some of this light was being absorbed before it reached the Earth. Hartmann reported that absorption from the "K" line of calcium appeared "extraordinarily weak, but almost perfectly sharp" and also reported the "quite surprising result that the calcium line at 393.4 nanometres does not share in the periodic displacements of the lines caused by the orbital motion of the spectroscopic binary star". The stationary nature of the line led Hartmann to conclude that the gas responsible for the absorption was not present in the atmosphere of Delta Orionis, but was instead located within an isolated cloud of matter residing somewhere along the line-of-sight to this star. This discovery launched the study of the Interstellar Medium.

In the series of investigations, Viktor Ambartsumian introduced the now commonly accepted notion that interstellar matter occurs in the form of clouds.

Following Hartmann's identification of interstellar calcium absorption, interstellar sodium was detected by  through the observation of stationary absorption from the atom's "D" lines at 589.0 and 589.6 nanometres towards Delta Orionis and Beta Scorpii.

Subsequent observations of the "H" and "K" lines of calcium by  revealed double and asymmetric profiles in the spectra of Epsilon and Zeta Orionis. These were the first steps in the study of the very complex interstellar sightline towards Orion. Asymmetric absorption line profiles are the result of the superposition of multiple absorption lines, each corresponding to the same atomic transition (for example the "K" line of calcium), but occurring in interstellar clouds with different radial velocities. Because each cloud has a different velocity (either towards or away from the observer/Earth) the absorption lines occurring within each cloud are either blue-shifted or red-shifted (respectively) from the lines' rest wavelength, through the Doppler Effect. These observations confirming that matter is not distributed homogeneously were the first evidence of multiple discrete clouds within the ISM.

The growing evidence for interstellar material led  to comment that "While the interstellar absorbing medium may be simply the ether, yet the character of its selective absorption, as indicated by Kapteyn, is characteristic of a gas, and free gaseous molecules are certainly there, since they are probably constantly being expelled by the Sun and stars."

The same year Victor Hess's discovery of cosmic rays, highly energetic charged particles that rain onto the Earth from space, led others to speculate whether they also pervaded interstellar space. The following year the Norwegian explorer and physicist Kristian Birkeland wrote: "It seems to be a natural consequence of our points of view to assume that the whole of space is filled with electrons and flying electric ions of all kinds. We have assumed that each stellar system in evolutions throws off electric corpuscles into space. It does not seem unreasonable therefore to think that the greater part of the material masses in the universe is found, not in the solar systems or nebulae, but in 'empty' space" .

 noted that "it could scarcely have been believed that the enormous gaps between the stars are completely void. Terrestrial aurorae are not improbably excited by charged particles emitted by the Sun. If the millions of other stars are also ejecting ions, as is undoubtedly true, no absolute vacuum can exist within the galaxy."

In September 2012, NASA scientists reported that polycyclic aromatic hydrocarbons (PAHs), subjected to interstellar medium (ISM) conditions, are transformed, through hydrogenation, oxygenation and hydroxylation, to more complex organics – "a step along the path toward amino acids and nucleotides, the raw materials of proteins and DNA, respectively". Further, as a result of these transformations, the PAHs lose their spectroscopic signature which could be one of the reasons "for the lack of PAH detection in interstellar ice grains, particularly the outer regions of cold, dense clouds or the upper molecular layers of protoplanetary disks."

In February 2014, NASA announced a greatly upgraded database for tracking polycyclic aromatic hydrocarbons (PAHs) in the universe. According to scientists, more than 20% of the carbon in the universe may be associated with PAHs, possible starting materials for the formation of life. PAHs seem to have been formed shortly after the Big Bang, are widespread throughout the universe, and are associated with new stars and exoplanets.

In April 2019, scientists, working with the Hubble Space Telescope, reported the confirmed detection of the large and complex ionized molecules of buckminsterfullerene (C60) (also known as "buckyballs") in the interstellar medium spaces between the stars.

See also

 Astrophysical maser
 Diffuse interstellar band
 Fossil stellar magnetic field
 Heliosphere
 List of interstellar and circumstellar molecules
 List of plasma physics articles
 Photodissociation region

References

Citations

Sources 

 
 
 
 
 
 
 
 
  The Wisconsin Hα Mapper is funded by the National Science Foundation.

External links

 Freeview Video 'Chemistry of Interstellar Space' William Klemperer, Harvard University. A Royal Institution Discourse by the Vega Science Trust.
 The interstellar medium: an online tutorial

Astrochemistry
 
Medium, interstellar
Articles containing video clips
Concepts in astronomy